Froidchapelle is a municipality of Wallonia located in the province of Hainaut, Belgium. 

On 1 January 2006 Froidchapelle had a total population of 3,626. The total area is 86.03 km2 which gives a population density of 42 inhabitants per km2.

The municipality consists of the following districts: Boussu-lez-Walcourt, Erpion, Fourbechies, Froidchapelle, and Vergnies.

The Eau d'Heure lakes are situated partly in this municipality and partly in neighbouring Cerfontaine.

References

External links
 

Municipalities of Hainaut (province)